The LG Folder 2 is a folder phone released by LG Electronics on April 14, 2020. The phone has a dual-camera setup with a 2 MP main camera, a 2.8 inches 240x320 pixels display, and a 1470 mAh Li-lon battery. It ships with Android Oreo.

References 

Android (operating system) devices